Philip James Collins (born 16 May 1967) is a British journalist, academic, banker and speechwriter.

Education
Collins was educated at Bury Grammar School, since 1976 an independent school for boys in the market town of Bury in Greater Manchester, followed by the University of Birmingham, Birkbeck College (a constituent college of the University of London), and St John's College at the University of Cambridge.

Career 
Collins spent several years as an equity strategist in investment banking. He was a political adviser to Frank Field and also worked for the Institute of Education at the University of London, and for the BBC and London Weekend Television.

He was director of the Social Market Foundation before becoming chief speech writer to Tony Blair, and was responsible for writing Blair's last speech as Leader of the Labour Party. In 2007 his was among many names put forward as possible Labour candidates in the constituency of Bolton South East, after the sitting Labour MP Brian Iddon announced he would retire at the 2010 election. Collins did not stand for this or any other seat.

Until August 2020, Collins was a leader writer and columnist for The Times. Private Eye claimed that Collins was "sacked by editor John Witherow for being insufficiently boosterish about the Woosterish Boris Johnson." As he left the newspaper, Collins wrote "Thank you to everyone who has said kind things about the writing I did for The Times and will now do elsewhere. I've always wanted to be thought too left wing but never thought I would achieve it."

He is a visiting fellow at the London School of Economics and an associate editor of Prospect magazine. The Liberal Republic (2009) is a pamphlet Collins wrote with his former colleague, Richard Reeves, who later became Nick Clegg's director of strategy.

He helped Sir Keir Starmer write his 2021 Conference speech.

Collins joined the New Statesman in September 2020 as a columnist and contributing writer.

Personal life 
Collins is married to newsreader Geeta Guru-Murthy; the couple have two children and live in London.

Bibliography

 Start Again: How We Can Fix Our Broken Politics (2018)

References 

1967 births
Living people
Alumni of Birkbeck, University of London
Alumni of St John's College, Cambridge
Alumni of the University of Birmingham
Labour Party (UK) officials
People educated at Bury Grammar School
Place of birth missing (living people)
Speechwriters
The Times people
Writers from London
British republicans